Ryszard Rogala (born 11 March 1975) is a Paralympic powerlifter of Poland. He began competing in Poland in 1999. He has won Paralympic medals for his nation.

He lost both his legs in 1995 after he fell under a train. He is now a county councillor in his hometown.

References 

1975 births
Living people
Paralympic powerlifters of Poland
Powerlifters at the 2000 Summer Paralympics
Powerlifters at the 2004 Summer Paralympics
Powerlifters at the 2008 Summer Paralympics
Paralympic silver medalists for Poland
Paralympic bronze medalists for Poland
Medalists at the 2004 Summer Paralympics
Medalists at the 2008 Summer Paralympics
Paralympic medalists in powerlifting
20th-century Polish people
21st-century Polish people